GTP cyclohydrolase 1 feedback regulatory protein is an enzyme that in humans is encoded by the GCHFR gene.

GTP cyclohydrolase I feedback regulatory protein binds to and mediates tetrahydrobiopterin inhibition of GTP cyclohydrolase I. The regulatory protein, GCHFR, consists of a homodimer. It is postulated that GCHFR may play a role in regulating phenylalanine metabolism in the liver and in the production of biogenic amine neurotransmitters and nitric oxide.

References

Further reading